Ferran Laviña is a Spanish former professional basketball player.

Trophies

With Joventut Badalona
Copa del Rey: (1) 2008
ULEB Cup: (1) 2008

Euroleague statistics

|-
| style="text-align:left;"| 2006–07
| style="text-align:left;"| DKV Joventut
| 20 || 6 || 14.3 || .343 || .222 || .889 || 1.8 || .5 || .6 || .1 || 3.9 || 3.3
|-
| style="text-align:left;"| 2008–09
| style="text-align:left;"| DKV Joventut
| 10 || 4 || 18.9 || .452 || .300 || .733 || 1.9 || 1.1 || .3 || .1 || 5.5 || 3.9
|-
| style="text-align:left;"| Career
| style="text-align:left;"| 
| 30 || 10 || 15.8 || .384 || .255 || .833 || 1.8 || .7 || .5 || .1 || 4.4 || 3.5

External links
ACB Profile
Euroleague.net Profile

1977 births
Living people
Baloncesto Fuenlabrada players
Bàsquet Manresa players
CB L'Hospitalet players
Gijón Baloncesto players
Joventut Badalona players
Liga ACB players
Small forwards
Spanish men's basketball players